Dragon 2 is a class of partially reusable spacecraft developed and manufactured by American aerospace manufacturer SpaceX, primarily for flights to the International Space Station (ISS). SpaceX has also launched private missions such as Inspiration4 and Axiom Mission 1. There are two variants: Crew Dragon, a spacecraft capable of ferrying four crew, and Cargo Dragon, an updated replacement for the original Dragon 1. The spacecraft consists of a reuseable space capsule and an expendable trunk module. The spacecraft launches atop a Falcon 9 Block 5 rocket and the capsule returns to Earth via splashdown.

Cargo Dragon supplies cargo to the ISS under a Commercial Resupply Services-2 contract with NASA. The first flight of Dragon 2 in a cargo configuration launched in December 2020. It shares this duty with Northrop Grumman Innovation Systems' Cygnus spacecraft, and Sierra Nevada Corporation's Dream Chaser spacecraft is expected to join them .

As of January 2023, Crew Dragon is the only U.S. human-rated orbital transport spacecraft, the only reusable orbital crewed spacecraft and the only reusable orbital cargo spacecraft currently in operation. Its primary role is to transport crews to and from the ISS under NASA's Commercial Crew Program, succeeding the crew orbital transportation capabilities of the Space Shuttle, which retired from service in 2011.  It will be joined by Boeing Starliner in this role . Crew Dragon is also used for commercial flights, some of them to the ISS, and is expected to be used to shuttle people to and from Axiom Space's planned space station.

Development and variants 
There are two variants of Dragon 2: Crew Dragon and Cargo Dragon. Crew Dragon was initially called "DragonRider" and it was intended from the beginning to support a crew of seven or a combination of crew and cargo. Earlier spacecraft had a berthing port and were berthed to ISS by ISS personnel. Dragon 2 instead has an IDSS-compatible docking port to dock to the International Docking Adapter ports on ISS. It is able to perform fully autonomous rendezvous and docking with manual override ability For typical missions, Crew Dragon will remain docked to the ISS for a period of 180 days, but is designed to remain on the station for up to 210 days, matching the Russian Soyuz spacecraft. SpaceX is using the Falcon 9 Block 5 launch vehicle to launch Dragon 2.

Crew Dragon 
Crew Dragon incorporates an integrated pusher launch escape system consisting of eight SuperDraco engines, capable of accelerating the vehicle away from the rocket in an emergency. SpaceX originally intended to use the SuperDraco engines to land Crew Dragon on land, with parachutes and an ocean splashdown employed only in the case of an aborted launch. Precision water landing under parachutes was proposed to NASA as "the baseline return and recovery approach for the first few flights" of Crew Dragon. Propulsive landing was later cancelled, leaving ocean splashdown under parachutes as the only option. Paragon Space Development Corporation assisted in developing Crew Dragon's life-support system.

In 2012, SpaceX was in talks with Orbital Outfitters about developing space suits to wear during launch and re-entry. Each crew member wears a custom space suit fitted for them. The suit is primarily designed for use inside the Dragon (IVA type suit): however, in the case of a rapid cabin depressurization, the suit can protect the crew members. The suit can also provide cooling for astronauts during normal flight. For the Demo-1 mission, a test dummy nicknamed Ripley was fitted with the spacesuit and sensors. The spacesuit is made from Nomex, a fire retardant fabric similar to Kevlar.

The spacecraft's design was unveiled on 29 May 2014, during a press event at SpaceX headquarters in Hawthorne, California. In October 2014, NASA selected the Dragon spacecraft as one of the candidates to fly American astronauts to the International Space Station, under the Commercial Crew Program. In March 2022, SpaceX President Gwynne Shotwell told Reuters that "We are finishing our final (capsule), but we still are manufacturing components, because we'll be refurbishing".

SpaceX's CCtCap contract values each seat on a Crew Dragon flight to be between US$60–67 million, while the face value of each seat has been estimated by NASA's Office of Inspector General (OIG) to be around US$55 million. This contrasts with the 2014 Soyuz launch price of US$76 million per seat for NASA astronauts. In case of private astronauts riding on Crew Dragon, SpaceX gives them Crew Dragon Astronaut Wings.

Cargo Dragon 
Although Dragon 2 was intended from the earliest design concept to carry crew, or with fewer seats, both crew and cargo, a second round of multi-year cargo supply contracts (also known as CRS-2) was solicited by NASA in 2014, to supply the ISS in 2020–2024. This led to SpaceX proposing a separately-named model, Cargo Dragon, for the NASA flights. SpaceX won a contract award for Cargo Dragon as a result of the CRS-2 bid competition, with contracts awarded in January 2016 for six flights.

Cargo Dragons are different from the crewed variant by launching without seats, cockpit controls, astronaut life support systems, or SuperDraco abort engines. Cargo Dragon improves on many aspects of the original Dragon design, including the recovery and refurbishment process. SpaceX plans to fly each Cargo Dragon capsule up to five times.

Design 

Dragon 2 includes the following features:

Dragon 2 is partially reusable, potentially resulting in a significant cost reduction. After earlier plans of SpaceX to use new capsules for every crewed flight for NASA both agreed to reuse Crew Dragon capsules for NASA flights. Cargo Dragon can carry  to the ISS; Crew Dragon has a capacity of seven astronauts (only four seats are used for NASA missions). Above the seats, there is a three-screen control panel, a toilet (with privacy curtain), and the docking hatch. Ocean landings are accomplished with four main parachutes in both variants. The parachute system was fully redesigned from the one used in the prior Dragon capsule, due to the need to deploy the parachutes under a variety of launch abort scenarios.

Crew Dragon has eight side-mounted SuperDraco engines, clustered in redundant pairs in four engine pods, with each engine able to produce  of thrust to be used for launch aborts. Each pod also contains four Draco thrusters that can be used for attitude control and orbital maneuvers. The SuperDraco engine combustion chamber is printed of Inconel, an alloy of nickel and iron, using a process of direct metal laser sintering. Engines are contained in a protective nacelle to prevent fault propagation if an engine fails.

Once in orbit, Dragon 2 is able to autonomously dock to the ISS. Dragon 1 was berthed using the Canadarm2 robotic arm, requiring substantially more involvement from ISS crew. Pilots of Crew Dragon retain the ability to dock the spacecraft using manual controls interfaced with a static tablet-like computer. The spacecraft can be operated in full vacuum, and "the crew will wear SpaceX-designed space suits to protect them from a rapid cabin depressurization emergency event".

Propellant and helium pressurant for both launch aborts and on-orbit maneuvering is contained in composite-carbon-overwrap titanium spherical tanks. A PICA-X heat shield protects the capsule during reentry. A reusable nose cone "protects the vessel and the docking adaptor during ascent and reentry", pivoting on a hinge to enable in-space docking and returning to the covered position for reentry and future launches.

The trunk is the third structural element of the spacecraft, containing solar panels, heat-removal radiators, and fins to provide aerodynamic stability during emergency aborts.

The previous Cargo Dragon's deployable solar arrays have been eliminated and are now built into the trunk itself. This increases volume space, reduces the number of mechanisms on the vehicle and further increases reliability.

Announced on 29 August 2021 during the CRS-23 launch is a new feature called Extend-the-Lab installed in the Cargo Dragon. "Our new Cargo Dragon vehicle is also able to act as a laboratory in the advancement of science and research. We call this capability Extend-the-Lab. It allows some powered payloads to remain on Dragon for experimentation during the duration of the mission. This is especially helpful when there is limited to no space on station for additional science. And it also helps cut down the amount of time the crew has to move payloads in and out of Dragon. For CRS-23 there are 3 Extend-the-Lab payloads launching with the mission, and once docked, a 4th which is currently already on the space station will be added to Dragon".

For missions not involving docking, the capsule docking adapter which is normally used to dock with the International Space Station can be replaced by a domed plexiglass window. This provides panoramic views of space and the Earth like the Cupola Module on the ISS to provide interest and make up space left after removal of the docking adapter during flight. The dome's first use was on the Inspiration4 flight.

Crewed flights 

Dragon is useful to both commercial and government customers. SpaceX and Bigelow Aerospace were working together to support round-trip transport of commercial passengers to low Earth orbit (LEO) destinations, but the plan was canceled. Instead Axiom launches commercial astronauts to the Space Station and intends to eventually launch to their own private space station. NASA flights to the ISS will only have four astronauts, with the added payload mass and volume used to carry pressurized cargo.

On 16 September 2014, NASA announced that SpaceX and Boeing had been selected to provide crew transportation to the ISS. SpaceX will receive US$2.6 billion under this contract. Dragon was the less expensive proposal, but NASA's William H. Gerstenmaier considered the CST-100 proposal the stronger of the two. However, Crew Dragon's first operational flight, SpaceX Crew-1, was on 16 November 2020 after several test flights while the CST-100 suffered several problems and delays, with its first operational flight slipped to no earlier than April 2023.

In a departure from the prior NASA practice, where construction contracts with commercial firms led to direct NASA operation of the spacecraft, NASA is purchasing space transport services from SpaceX, including construction, launch, and operation of the Dragon 2.

In August 2018, NASA and SpaceX agreed on the loading procedures for propellants, vehicle fluids and crew. High-pressure helium will be loaded first, followed by the passengers approximately two hours prior to scheduled launch; the ground crew will then depart the launch pad and move to a safe distance. The launch escape system will be activated approximately 40 minutes prior to launch, with propellant loading commencing several minutes later.

The first automated test mission launched to the International Space Station (ISS) on 2 March 2019. After schedule slips, the first crewed flight launched on 30 May 2020 with the launch of the Demo-2 mission.

In June 2019, Bigelow Space Operations announced it had reserved with SpaceX up to four missions of four passengers each to ISS as early as 2020 and planned to sell them for around US$52 million per seat. These plans were canceled by September 2019.

On 18 February 2020, building on development for NASA's Commercial Crew Program, Space Adventures announced an agreement with SpaceX to fly up to four paying customers on a standalone mission aboard a Crew Dragon spacecraft in late 2021 or 2022 that could reach an altitude two-to-three times higher than the International Space Station. However, by October 2021 the contract had expired, but a similar mission Polaris Dawn will be flown on which the first private spacewalk shall be conducted.

Testing 

SpaceX planned a series of four flight tests for the Crew Dragon: a "pad abort" test, an uncrewed orbital flight to the ISS, an in-flight abort test, and finally a 14-day crewed demonstration mission to the ISS, which was initially planned for July 2019, but after a Dragon capsule explosion, was delayed to May 2020.

Pad abort and hover tests 

The pad abort test was conducted successfully on 6 May 2015 at SpaceX's leased SLC-40. Dragon landed safely in the ocean to the east of the launchpad 99 seconds after ignition of the SuperDraco engines. While a flight-like Dragon 2 and trunk were used for the pad abort test, they rested atop a truss structure for the test rather than a full Falcon 9 rocket. A crash test dummy embedded with a suite of sensors was placed inside the test vehicle to record acceleration loads and forces at the crew seat, while the remaining six seats were loaded with weights to simulate full-passenger-load weight. The test objective was to demonstrate sufficient total impulse, thrust and controllability to conduct a safe pad abort. A fuel mixture ratio issue was detected after the flight in one of the eight SuperDraco engines causing it to under perform, but did not materially affect the flight.

On 24 November 2015, SpaceX conducted a test of Dragon 2's hovering abilities at the firm's rocket development facility in McGregor, Texas. In a video, the spacecraft is shown suspended by a hoisting cable and igniting its SuperDraco engines to hover for about 5 seconds, balancing on its 8 engines firing at reduced thrust to compensate exactly for gravity. The test vehicle was the same capsule that performed the pad abort test earlier in 2015; it was nicknamed DragonFly.

Demo-1: Orbital flight test 

In 2015, NASA named its first Commercial Crew astronaut cadre of four veteran astronauts to work with SpaceX and Boeing – Robert Behnken, Eric Boe, Sunita Williams, and Douglas Hurley. The Demo-1 mission completed the last milestone of the Commercial Crew Development program, paving the way to starting commercial services under an upcoming ISS Crew Transportation Services contract. On 3 August 2018, NASA announced the crew for the DM-2 mission. The crew of two consisted of NASA astronauts Bob Behnken and Doug Hurley. Behnken previously flew as mission specialist on the STS-123 and the STS-130 missions. Hurley previously flew as a pilot on the STS-127 mission and on the final Space Shuttle mission, the STS-135 mission.

The first orbital test of Crew Dragon was an uncrewed mission, officially designated "Crew Demo-1"  and launched on 2 March 2019. The spacecraft tested the approach and automated docking procedures with the ISS, remained docked until 8 March 2019, then conducted the full re-entry, splashdown and recovery steps to qualify for a crewed mission. Life-support systems were monitored all along the test flight. The same capsule was planned to be re-used in June 2019 for an in-flight abort test before it exploded on 20 April 2019.

Explosion during testing 

On 20 April 2019, the Crew Dragon capsule used in the Demo-1 mission was destroyed in an explosion during static fire testing at the Landing Zone 1 facility. On the day of the explosion, the initial testing of the Crew Dragon's Draco thrusters was successful, with the anomaly occurring during the test of the SuperDraco abort system.

Telemetry, high-speed camera footage, and analysis of recovered debris indicate the problem occurred when a small amount of dinitrogen tetroxide leaked into a helium line used to pressurize the propellant tanks. The leakage apparently occurred during pre-test processing. As a result, the pressurization of the system 100 ms before firing damaged a check valve and resulted in the explosion.

Since the destroyed capsule had been slated for use in the upcoming in-flight abort test, the explosion and investigation delayed that test and the subsequent crewed orbital test.

The SuperDraco engine test that failed on 20 April 2019 was repeated successfully on 13 November 2019. The full duration static fire test of Crew Dragon's launch escape system took place at Cape Canaveral Space Force Station at SpaceX's Landing Zone 1 at 20:08 UTC. The test was successful, showing that the modifications made to the vehicle to prevent a failure like the one that happened 20 April 2019 were successful. The vehicle used for this ground test would also be used for the following in-flight abort test.

Some of the modifications are:
 Replacement of the valves with burst discs: Unlike valves, burst discs are designed for single use.
 Addition of flaps on each SuperDraco in order to reseal the thrusters prior to splashdown in the ocean, preventing water intrusion.

In-flight abort test 

The Crew Dragon in-flight abort test was launched on 19 January 2020 at 15:30 UTC from LC-39A on a suborbital trajectory to conduct a separation and abort scenario in the troposphere at transonic velocities shortly after passing through max Q, where the vehicle experiences maximum aerodynamic pressure. The Dragon 2 used its SuperDraco abort engines to push itself away from the Falcon 9 after an intentional premature engine cutoff, after which the Falcon was destroyed by aerodynamic forces. The Dragon followed its suborbital trajectory to apogee, at which point the spacecraft's trunk was jettisoned. The smaller Draco engines were then used to orient the vehicle for the descent. All major functions were executed, including separation, engine firings, parachute deployment, and landing. Dragon 2 splashed down at 15:38:54 UTC just off the Florida coast in the Atlantic Ocean. The test objective was to demonstrate the ability to safely move away from the ascending rocket under the most challenging atmospheric conditions of the flight trajectory, imposing the worst structural stress of a real flight on the rocket and spacecraft. The abort test was performed using a Falcon 9 Block 5 rocket with a fully fueled second stage with a mass simulator replacing the Merlin engine.

Earlier, this test had been scheduled before the uncrewed orbital test, however, SpaceX and NASA considered it safer to use a flight representative capsule rather than the test article from the pad abort test.

This test was previously planned to use the capsule C204 from Demo-1, however, C204 was destroyed in an explosion during a static fire testing on 20 April 2019. Capsule C205, originally planned for Demo-2 was used for the In-Flight Abort Test with C206 being planned for use during Demo-2. This was the final flight test of the spacecraft before it began carrying astronauts to the International Space Station under NASA's Commercial Crew Program.

Prior to the flight test, teams completed launch day procedures for the first crewed flight test, from suit-up to launch pad operations. The joint teams conducted full data reviews that needed to be completed prior to NASA astronauts flying on the system during SpaceX's Demo-2 mission.

Demo-2: crewed orbital flight test 

On 17 April 2020, NASA Administrator Jim Bridenstine announced the first crewed Crew Dragon Demo-2 to the International Space Station would launch on 27 May 2020. Astronauts Bob Behnken and Doug Hurley crewed the mission, marking the first crewed launch to the International Space Station from U.S. soil since STS-135 in July 2011. The original launch was postponed to 30 May 2020 due to weather conditions at the launch site. The second launch attempt was successful, with capsule C206, later named Endeavour by the crew, launching on 30 May 2020 19:22 UTC. The capsule successfully docked with the International Space Station on 31 May 2020 at 14:27 UTC. On 2 August 2020, Crew Dragon undocked and splashed-down successfully in the Atlantic Ocean.

Launching in the Dragon 2 spacecraft was described by astronaut Bob Behnken as "smooth off the pad" but "we were definitely driving and riding a dragon all the way up ... a little bit less g's [than the Space Shuttle] but more 'alive' is probably the best way I would describe it".

Regarding descent in the spacecraft, Behnken stated, "Once we descended a little bit into the atmosphere, Dragon really came alive. It started to fire thrusters and keep us pointed in the appropriate direction. The atmosphere starts to make noise—you can hear that rumble outside the vehicle. And as the vehicle tries to control, you feel a little bit of that shimmy in your body. ...  We could feel those small rolls and pitches and yaws—all those little motions were things we picked up on inside the vehicle. ... All the separation events, from the trunk separation through the parachute firings, were very much like getting hit in the back of the chair with a baseball bat ... pretty light for the trunk separation but with the parachutes it was a pretty significant jolt".

List of vehicles

List of flights 
List includes only completed or currently manifested missions. Launch dates are listed in UTC.

Crew Dragon flights

Cargo Dragon flights 

NASA has ordered six additional flights, CRS-30 to CRS-35, to resupply the ISS through 2026.

Timeline
Crew Dragon has flown five operational CCP missions and four other missions. Cargo Dragon has flown six missions.
 ||28}}  
Define $endofmonth =/$lastday/  
Define $now =//
ImageSize = width:840 height:auto barincrement:40
PlotArea  = top:10 bottom:44 right:20 left:0
DateFormat = mm/dd/yyyy
Period     = from:03/01/2019 till:$endofmonth
TimeAxis   = orientation:horizontal
ScaleMajor  = unit:year increment:1 start:01/01/2020
ScaleMinor  = unit:month increment:1 start:03/01/2019

Colors =
  id:bg        value:white
  id:docked    value:rgb(0.894,0.882,0.871) 
  id:undocked  value:limegreen
  id:CCP       value:skyblue legend: Crew_Dragon_CCP 
  id:nonCCP    value:coral   legend: Crew_dragon_non-CCP   
  id:CRS       value:orange  legend: Cargo_dragon   

Legend = columns:3 left:150 top:25 columnwidth:200

PlotData=
  fontsize:12 shift:(0,-5)

 bar:NonCCP
   from:03/03/2019 till:03/08/2019 color:nonCCP text:Demo-1
   from:05/31/2020 till:08/01/2020 color:nonCCP text:Demo-2
   from:09/16/2021 till:09/18/2021 color:nonCCP text:Inspiration4
   from:04/09/2022 till:04/25/2022 color:nonCCP text:Axiom-1

 bar:CCPA
   from:11/17/2020 till:05/02/2021 color:CCP text:Crew-1
   from:11/11/2021 till:05/05/2022 color:CCP text:Crew-3
   from:10/05/2022 till:03/11/2023 color:CCP text:Crew-5
 bar:CCPB
   from:04/24/2021 till:11/08/2021 color:CCP text:Crew-2
   from:04/27/2022 till:10/14/2022 color:CCP text:Crew-4
   from:03/02/2023 till:$now color:CCP text:Crew-6

 bar:CRSA
   from:12/07/2020 till:01/12/2021 color:CRS text:CRS-21
   from:08/30/2021 till:09/30/2021 color:CRS text:CRS-23
   from:07/16/2022 till:08/19/2022 color:CRS text:CRS-25
   from:03/15/2023 till:$now color:CRS text:CRS-27
 bar:CRSB
   from:06/05/2021 till:07/08/2021 color:CRS text:CRS-22
   from:12/22/2021 till:01/23/2022 color:CRS text:CRS-24
   from:11/26/2022 till:01/11/2023 color:CRS text:CRS-26

LineData=

 layer:front
 at:11/17/2020 width:0.1 color:docked
 at:05/02/2021 width:0.1 color:undocked
 at:04/24/2021 width:0.1 color:docked
 at:11/08/2021 width:0.1 color:undocked
 at:11/11/2021 width:0.1 color:docked
 at:05/05/2022 width:0.1 color:undocked
 at:04/27/2022 width:0.1 color:docked
 at:10/14/2022 width:0.1 color:undocked
 at:10/05/2022 width:0.1 color:docked
 at:03/11/2023 width:0.1 color:undocked
 at:03/02/2023 width:0.1 color:docked

}}

Cancelled flights 
Space Adventures contracted SpaceX for a five-day, high elliptic orbit space tourism mission with a Crew Dragon in 2022, which planned to send four crew members to an altitude over twice the height of the ISS, and higher than the current altitude record for an orbital crewed spacecraft, set by the Gemini 11 mission in 1966. In October 2021, Space Adventures stated that the contract had expired and would not be executed, but left open the possibility of a partnership with SpaceX in the future. Many goals of the Space Adventures flight are currently being targeted by Polaris Dawn, to be flown no earlier than July 2023.

See also 

 Comparison of crewed space vehicles
 Comparison of space station cargo vehicles
 List of crewed spacecraft

Notes

References

External links 

 Real-time orbital tracking - uphere.space
 Real-time orbital tracking - isstracker.pl

SpaceX Dragon 2
SpaceX spacecraft
Crewed spacecraft
Vehicles introduced in 2019
Supply vehicles for the International Space Station
Reusable spacecraft
SpaceX related lists